Bertschikon may refer to:

 Bertschikon bei Attikon, a municipality in the Swiss canton of Zürich
 Bertschikon bei Gossau, a settlement in the municipality of Gossau in the Swiss canton of Zürich